Zostaň is the ninth solo album by Marika Gombitová released on Jumbo Records in 1994.

Track listing

Official releases
 1994: Zostaň, CD, MC, Jumbo Records, #0025 2311
 2006: Zostaň, bonus material ("Paradiso" video + slideshow), CD, Jumbo Records, #0025 2311

Credits and personnel

 Marika Gombitová – lead vocal, music
 Václav Patejdl – music, arranger, programming, keyboards, chorus
 Štefan Hegeds – arranger, programming, keyboards
 Henry Tóth – guitars

 Jana Ktreiberová – chorus
 Elena Matušová – chorus
 Marcel Palonder – chorus
 Jozef Krajčovič – sound director, technical coordination, mix
 Relax – studio

Re-release

Track listing

Additional credits and personnel
 Václav Patejdl – arranger (track 4)

References

General

Specific

External links 
 

1994 albums
Marika Gombitová albums